Collings Mountain is a summit in the U.S. state of Oregon.

Collings Mountain was named after an early settler.

References

Mountains of Jackson County, Oregon
Mountains of Oregon